Mulberry is a British fashion company founded in 1971, best known for its luxury leather goods, particularly women's handbags.

History

Early years
The company was founded in 1971 by Roger Saul and his mother, Joan. In 1973, they opened a factory in Chilcompton, Somerset, England. The area was already well-known for leather fabrication, notably by Clarks shoes.

Mulberry established itself as a British lifestyle brand that was noted for its leather poacher bags, including the binocular bag and dispatch bag. The range includes male and female fashions, leather accessories, and footwear. Mulberry Group plc is listed on the London Stock Exchange as MUL, and shareholders with 250 or more shares are entitled to a 20% discount at Mulberry's shops.

In 2000, Saul recruited Scott Henshall as Mulberry's Creative Director. At that time, the company was in the red and Henshall was enlisted to transform the company. He produced jewel items and was responsible for the fashion and accessory collections, as well as Mulberry's rebranding and advertising, where Henshall chose Anna Friel as the face of Mulberry. He placed the brand on major celebrities, including Victoria Beckham, Kate Winslet, Cameron Diaz and Zara Tindall. Henshall departed from Mulberry in 2001 to focus on his own mainline collection.

In 2006, Mulberry launched an apprenticeship programme to encourage local youths to learn production skills, and to provide training and employment for the local community. Apprentices that graduate from the programme are offered a job at the factories in Somerset.

The company reported revenue in 2012 of £168.5 million, and an operating income of £35.4 million, with a net income of £36.0 million.

Recent times

In 2013, Ian Scott, director of a group supply at Mulberry Chilcompton Somerset, was interviewed by Luke Leitch of The Telegraph. He stated that many items (including all men's bags) are made in three Turkish factories also used by brands including Dunhill and Givenchy. The "small leather goods" (such as purses, wallets and phone-holders) are made in China, as is the Mulberry scotch-grain luggage.

Designer Emma Hill joined Mulberry in 2007. Hill was credited with creating items for the company such as the Alexa Chung handbag. Profits for the firm were initially strong after Hill's appointment, however the brand struggled during the credit crisis, and has issued two profit warnings in the past year. In June 2013, it was announced that Hill would be leaving the brand due to creative differences. Company share prices fell in the wake of the announcement.

During the year 2014, four new directly operated stores were opened in the US and in Germany, one new concession was opened in France and the Stansted Airport store was temporarily closed due to the redevelopment of the terminal. As of 31 March 2015, there were 70 directly operated stores.

For the year ended 31 March 2015, the Mulberry Group announced that the company’s total revenues were 148.7 million pounds (229.5 million dollars), down 9 percent from 163.5 million pounds (252.5 million dollars) in 2013, reflecting a small growth in retail sales which was offset by a decline in wholesale sales.

In March 2017, Mulberry launched its Mulberry Asia business with Challice, a joint venture partner. In July 2017, Mulberry signed a deal with Onward Global Fashion in Japan to form a joint venture named Mulberry Japan, to be headquartered in Tokyo.

In February 2020, Mike Ashley's Frasers Group bought a 12.5 per cent stake in Mulberry, said by a business journalist for The Times to be worth around £19 million.

Stores and factories

Mulberry has stores throughout the UK and all over the world including Europe, the US, Australia and Asia. It has registered offices in Somerset, London and New York City. Mulberry continues to make designer leather goods at its original Somerset factory, called The Rookery. In summer 2013 Mulberry's second factory, also based in Somerset, started production. It was formally named 'The Willows' in March 2014, after the nearby Willow Man sculpture.

References

External links

English brands
Fashion accessory brands
Luxury brands
High fashion brands
Companies based in Somerset
Companies listed on the London Stock Exchange